The men's high jump at the 2016 IAAF World Indoor Championships took place on March 19, 2016.

With eight over 2.29, the medals were settled by clearing 2.33, but not in order.  Robert Grabarz was the first over.  Erik Kynard had a perfect round going until missing his first attempt.  He cleared it on his second.  Gianmarco Tamberi made it on his third attempt.  Defending champion Mutaz Essa Barshim, also was perfect before 2.33, but after two misses, passed to make one big attempt at 2.36.  Barshim failed, but Tamberi cleared it on his first attempt.  Even though he had five misses, more than anyone else in the competition, Tamberi leaped from third to first.

Results
The final was started at 18:22.

References

High jump
High jump at the World Athletics Indoor Championships